Mary Richards is the main character of the television sitcom The Mary Tyler Moore Show

Mary Richards may refer to:
 Mary Lea Johnson Richards (1926–1990), American heiress, entrepreneur, and Broadway producer
 Mary Richards (cricketer), English cricketer
 Mary Alice Eleanor Richards, British botanist
 Mary Jane Richards, British theatre actress
 Mary Bowser, Union spy during the Civil War

See also
 Mary Richard (1940–2010), Aboriginal activist and politician in Winnipeg, Manitoba, Canada
 Richards (surname)